Qaleh Now-e Palangari (also Romanized as Qal‘eh Now-e Pālangarī; also known as Qal‘eh Now) is a village in Kamfiruz-e Shomali Rural District, Kamfiruz District, Marvdasht County, Fars Province, Iran. At the 2006 census, its population was 262, in 58 families.

References 

Populated places in Marvdasht County